Whitecross is a small village in County Armagh, Northern Ireland. It lies within the civil parish of Ballymyre and the townland of Corlat. In the 2011 Census it had a recorded population of 352.

It has one public house, which was built in the 1970s on the site of the old police barracks. The original public house stood a few hundred yards away, at the bottom of the Ballymoyer Road. The old creamery was held in high regard and was once noted for producing fine butter and cheese for rich Irish households. It was also one of the earliest co-operatives in the country.
The townland of Corlat is one of eight townlands given to the Maor family as reward for keeping the famous Book of Armagh (the name Maor meaning "steward" or "keeper" in Irish). This famous book is now held at Trinity College, Dublin.

The most notable incident in Whitecross during The Troubles was the shooting dead of three Catholic brothers by the Ulster Volunteer Force on 4 January 1976.

Schools
Kingsmills Primary School
St. Malachy's Primary School
St. Teresa's Primary School

References

NI Neighbourhood Information System

Villages in County Armagh
Civil parish of Ballymyre
Newry and Mourne District Council